Gerold Keller is a former Swiss curler.

At the national level, he is a three-time Swiss men's champion curler (1962, 1963, 1964).

Teams

References

External links
 
 

Living people
Sportspeople from the canton of Schwyz
Swiss male curlers
Swiss curling champions
20th-century Swiss people
Year of birth missing (living people)
Place of birth missing (living people)